101% Love is a 2022 Burmese drama television series. It aired on MRTV-4, from November 3 to December 21, 2022, on Mondays to Fridays at 19:00 for 35 episodes.

Synopsis
In Mandalay, Phoe Thar heard the sound of a violin and followed her to see a girl named Moe Ni playing the violin. They were talking and after a while, they knew that Moe Ni's grandfather was dying. Phoe Thar is very friendly with Moe Ni and wants to take her to Yangon. However, Phoe Thar was separated from Moe Ni.  When Phoe Thar came of age, he found out that Moe Ni's father had taken her to Yangon. Shwe Thway is looking for Moe Ni until he reaches adulthood. Phoe Thar real name is Shwe Thway. When Shwe Thway met Moe Ni again, her name was Khin Pyae Sone. Khin Pyae Sone lives with her three brothers and one aunt. One day Shwe Thway and Khin Pyae Sone became lovers. At first, her three brothers did not agree to marry the two of them. One day, she ran away with Shwe Thway, and when Khin Pyae Sone was pregnant, her brothers accepted her back. U Soe Moe, father of Shwe Thway, also had a story from his childhood. Soe Moe loved Angela, but Angela did not accept his love.  Cynthia loves Soe Moe, but Soe Moe only loves Angela. Angela said that she loves Cynthia's younger brother Steven in front of Soe Moe.  However, Soe Moe did not give up. Soe Moe's parents and Angela's parents agreed and prepared to marry Soe Moe and Angela.  Before getting married, Cynthia took Angela out to run away with Steven. Steven died in a car accident on the road. Soe Moe and Angela got married. Cynthia says that her younger brother's death was caused by Soe Moe, and she keeps it dark until she is old.

Cast
Kaung Myat San as Shwe Thway
Hsaung Wutyee May as Khin Pyae Sone
Yan Aung as U Soe Moe
Khin Zarchi Kyaw as Daw Khin Ma Ma
Htoo Mon as Daw Cynthia
Moe Thura as Soe Moe
Kaung Htet Thar as Steven
Su Htet Hlaing as Cynthia
Su Mon as Angela
Moe Thadar as Moe Thadar
Shinn Myat as Ko Lay
Soe Htun Win as Ko Gyi
Min Zay as Ko Latt
Shine Zay as Alinkar

References

Burmese television series
MRTV (TV network) original programming